St. Anthony's Hospital fire was a disaster that occurred on April 4, 1949 in Effingham, Illinois. The disaster killed 74 people at the hospital. It is used as a prime example of possible fire hazards hospitals could and can have.
St. Anthony's Hospital in Effingham, Illinois, was operated by the Sisters of St. Francis, who lived in a convent next door.

Building 
The about 100-bed hospital was constructed mainly out of wood and brick. Parts of the building dated back to 1876. By 1949 the facility was completely outdated. It contained open corridors and staircases. Many walls and ceilings were covered with oilcloth fabrics and combustible soundproof tiles. The building lacked sprinklers as well as fire detection and alarm systems.

Fire 
Shortly before midnight on April 4, 1949, a fire broke out at St. Anthony's Hospital. It spread rapidly through the building because of the open construction of the building and the combustible building materials. One of the victims, Frank Ries, was alerted about the fire shortly after it was detected after a hospital switchboard operator, Sister Anastasia Groesch, telephoned him to the hospital. He was called prior to the fire department and attempted to extinguish the fire by spraying a fire extinguisher down the laundry chute on each floor. The fire had been reported to Sister Groesch by Sister Mary Edmunda Hiersig, who reported that she smelled smoke in the first floor around 11:30 pm as she was going off duty.

There were 116 patients and ten staff on duty when the fire started. Many of them were trapped on the upper floors by the rapid spread of the fire. These included eleven newborn infants in the nursery and the nurse who stayed behind with them. Many who were on the first floor were able to either walk out or escape via low windows; however, many who jumped to escape from the fire from the second or third floors had long lasting injuries. Others were rescued by doctors and nurses who returned into the building multiple times until they were overcome by the fire or their injuries and unable to return into the building.

The twenty-six men and three pumpers of the Effingham Volunteer Fire Department were under prepared for the rapidly spreading fire, that had already burned through the building roof within ten minutes of the fires being detected and the department arriving. The department was small and only had three pumping engines and no ladder trucks or other equipment to rescue patients trapped on the second or third floors.  Eleven mutual aid departments also responded.

Victims 
A total of 74 people died, including patients, nurses, nuns, a priest and Frank Ries, the hospital engineer who ran into the flames to try to rescue his wife. A historian for the Effingham County Museum stated that about 88% of the victims were either female or under the age of 12 years-old.

Aftermath 
The Red Cross set up an inquiry bureau in the town to help victims and survivors family and friends identify and locate them. Blood plasma, blankets and other medical and relief supplies were also donated to victims by the Red Cross.

Funds were raised to build a new hospital, through a letter campaign which sent about 293,500 letters that referenced the death of Nurse Fern Riley. Within two weeks the campaign raised $300,000 and ended with a total of $563,000 by the end of the summer.

The cause of the fire remains unknown. However, investigators quickly identified the many safety deficiencies at St. Anthony's Hospital. In response to the fire, Governor Adlai Stevenson ordered the evaluation of all the hospitals in the state to identify and mitigate fire hazards. The impact of the fire went beyond Illinois as hospitals across the United States made many of the fire protection improvements that are standard today.

References

Fires in Illinois
1949 in Illinois
1949 fires in the United States
Building and structure fires in the United States
April 1949 events in the United States
Hospital fires